Baldiri Alavedra Pla (21 February 1944 – 13 April 2020) was a Spanish professional footballer who played as a midfielder.

Career
Born in Gavà, Alavedra played for Condal, Sabadell, Xerez, Terrassa, Gramenet and Gavà.

Later life and death
Alavedra died on 13 April 2020 at the age of 76, from COVID-19 in Gavà during the COVID-19 pandemic in Spain.

References

1944 births
2020 deaths
Spanish footballers
CD Condal players
CE Sabadell FC footballers
Xerez CD footballers
Terrassa FC footballers
UDA Gramenet footballers
CF Gavà players
Segunda División players
La Liga players
Association football midfielders
Deaths from the COVID-19 pandemic in Spain
Footballers from Catalonia
People from Baix Llobregat
Sportspeople from the Province of Barcelona